

Solo Christian albums

References

Discographies of American artists
Pop music discographies
Christian music discographies